Mark Sammut may refer to:

 Mark Anthony Sammut (born 1986), Maltese politician 
 Mark Sammut (swimmer)